Andrea De Falco (born 19 June 1986) is an Italian footballer. He plays for Serie D club Nereto.

Career

Early career
He started his career at native club A.C. Ancona. He was awarded number 37 shirt of the first team on 24 January 2004. After making 7 Serie A appearances for the team in the second half of 2003–04 Serie A, he was signed by newly-promoted Serie A team Fiorentina on a free transfer, which Ancona faced bankruptcy and condemnation to Serie C2.

After playing a half season for the Primavera team, he was loaned to Pisa of Serie C1 in the second half of 2004–05 season. De Falco returned to Primavera team on 1 July and finished as runners-up of Campionato Nazionale Primavera losing to Juventus 0–2.

Pescara
De Falco was sold to Pescara (Serie B) in a co-ownership deal on 20 June 2006 for a peppercorn of five hundred euro, joining Antonio Aquilanti. In June 2007, Pescara bought De Falco outright by winning the auction between the club, for another five hundred euros.

Chievo
De Falco was signed by Chievo in August 2007, for free.  However, he was immediately farmed to Taranto in another co-ownership deal, for a peppercorn of five hundred euro. In June 2008 Chievo bought back De Falco for an undisclosed fee.

He returned to Ancona for the 2008/09 season, on loan along with Stefano Olivieri from Chievo.

De Falco then spent 3 more seasons on loan, for Ancona again in 2009–10, Sassuolo in 2010–11 and Bari in 2011–12. De Falco also played once for Chievo in 2011–12 Coppa Italia. Bari did not excised the option to sign De Falco in June 2012. However, the club did in August.

Bari
On 27 August 2012 De Falco was exchanged with Nicola Bellomo, plus €350,000 cash to Bari. Both club retained 50% registration rights of their players. De Falco signed a three-year contract. The co-ownership deals were renewed in June 2013. In January 2014 De Falco was signed by S.S. Juve Stabia in a temporary deal. In March 2014 the liquidator of Bari valued the 50% registration rights of De Falco was €161,540.4, instead of the purchase price in 2012 (€1.4 million) nor any partial amortized value. In June 2014 Bari signed De Falco outright, for another €400,000, with Idriz Toskić moved to Chievo also for another €400,000.

Benevento
On 16 July 2014 De Falco was signed by Benevento in a two-year contract on a free transfer.

Reggina
On 15 January 2019, he signed a 1.5-year contract with Reggina.

Viterbese
On 1 August 2019, he joined Viterbese. On 22 February 2021, his contract was terminated by mutual consent.

Serie D
On 25 February 2021, he joined Siena in Serie D. On 27 September 2021 he signed with Nereto, also in Serie D.

Match-fixing-scandal
De Falco was involved in the 2011–12 Italian football match-fixing scandal.

References

External links
Stats at tarantochannel (In Excel file) 
 

1986 births
Living people
Sportspeople from the Province of Ancona
Italian footballers
Italy youth international footballers
Serie A players
Serie B players
Serie C players
Serie D players
Association football midfielders
A.C. Ancona players
Pisa S.C. players
ACF Fiorentina players
Delfino Pescara 1936 players
Taranto F.C. 1927 players
A.C. ChievoVerona players
U.S. Sassuolo Calcio players
S.S.C. Bari players
S.S. Juve Stabia players
Benevento Calcio players
Matera Calcio players
L.R. Vicenza players
Reggina 1914 players
U.S. Viterbese 1908 players
A.C.N. Siena 1904 players
Footballers from Marche